Mario Tamagno (19 June 1877 – 1941) was an Italian architect who worked mainly in early 20th-century Siam (modern-day Thailand).

Biography
He was educated at the Albertina Academy of Fine Arts in Turin, where he became an instructor after graduating in 1895. He travelled to Siam in 1900, where he entered employment with the Siamese government in a twenty-five-year contract. He was among many Westerners, particularly Italians, who were employed as architects and civil engineers during the reign of King Chulalongkorn. He produced many works, and contributed extensively with Annibale Rigotti, most notably on the Ananta Samakhom Throne Hall.

He married his classmate of Accademia Albertina, Marianna Zuccaro, who came to Bangkok in 1901.

After the term of his government contract (1900-1925), he was asked by the Siamese government to continue his work for Villa Norasing (today House of Government) during its last phase of construction, in May 1926 he returned to his homeland with a lifetime retirement income from the Government of Siam.

Notable contributions

 Makkhawan Rangsan Bridge
 Oriental Hotel
 The first office of the Siam Commercial Bank
 Phitsanulok Mansion
 Bang Khun Phrom Palace (1906)
 Suan Kularb Residential Hall and Abhisek Dusit Throne Hall in the Dusit Palace
 Hua Lamphong Railway Station (1907)
 Neilson Hays Library (1920–22)

Collaborations with Annibale Rigotti:
 Wat Benchamabophit (under Prince Narisara Nuvadtivongs)
 Nongkhran Samoson Hall in Suan Sunanda Palace (1911)
 Siam pavilion at the 1911 Turin International world's fair.
 Santa Cruz Church (1913, reconstruction), not mentioned in Mario Tamagno's records.
 Thewarat Sapharom Throne Hall in the Phaya Thai Palace (c.1910)

References
 
 Lohapon, Neungreudee. Buon fratello e Amico Thailandia-Italia : 140 Anni Di Relazioni Italo-Thailandesi - ภราดามหามิตร ไทย-อิตาลี : 140 ปี ความสัมพันธ์ไทย-อิตาลี. published by The Royal Thai Embassy in Rome, printed by Amarin Printing and Publishing, Bangkok 2010.
 
 Tamagno, Elena. Mario Tamagno: Twenty-five years serving the court of Siam as an architect -มาริโอ ตามานโญ.ยี่สิบห้าปีแห่งการเป็นสถาปนิกในราชสำนักสยาม (๒๔๔๓-๒๔๖๘). in Muang Boran. vol. 24. no. 2 April–June 1998.
 

20th-century Italian architects
Italian expatriates in Thailand
Expatriate architects in the Rattanakosin Kingdom
Accademia Albertina alumni
Academic staff of Accademia Albertina
1877 births
1941 deaths